Ribosomal modification protein rimK like family member B is a protein that in humans is encoded by the RIMKLB gene.

References

Further reading